Sinentomon erythranum is a species of proturan in the family Sinentomidae. It is found in Southern Asia. Yin (1965) reported it to be widely distributed in the South Chinese provinces of Hainan, Shanghai, Jiangsu, Zhejiang, Anhui, Fujian, Guangxi, Guangdong, Hunan, Guizhou and Yunnan.

References

Protura
Articles created by Qbugbot
Animals described in 1965